Media monitoring is the activity of monitoring the output of the print, online and broadcast media. It is based on analyzing a diverse range of media platforms in order to identify trends that can be used for a variety of reasons such as political, commercial and scientific purposes.

It can be conducted in a systematic way by comparing the content presented in the media with external sources, in an attempt of fact-checking, or in a less formal and time demanding manner by independent groups and media critics that aim to check the quality of what is available on the media, especially related to press freedom and focusing on the concept of responsibilizing the media organizations. In general, media monitoring focuses on developing insights, in various fields, of what is actually occurring while finding the balance to not overanalyze certain factors.

In business
In the commercial sphere, media monitoring is usually carried out in-house or by a media monitoring service company that can provide such services on a subscription basis.

The services that media monitoring companies provide typically include the systematic recording of radio and television broadcasts, social media, web-tv, the collection of press clippings from print media publications and the collection of data from online information sources. The material collected usually consists of any media output that makes reference to the client, its activities and its designated topics of interests. The monitoring of online consumer sources such as blogs, forums and social networks is more specifically known as buzz monitoring which informs the company of how its service or product is perceived by users.

Most media monitoring is done within private public relations agencies or businesses in house public relations sectors. Publicists will track the number of times the company was mentioned within different platforms, including magazines, newspapers, blogs, and social media.  These entries are referred to as “clippings” and are compiled into monthly reports by the Public Relations firm and then presented to the client along with the circulation and impressions from these platforms.  Circulation is how many subscribers or viewers the platform has, and impressions are calculated by multiplying the circulation by three.  Impressions are only calculated for print media because it is assumed print media will be circulated past the original subscribers.  These figures are calculated to show the client approximately how many people their message has reached.

In social sciences
Media monitoring is often deployed by social scientists to look at how something is presented in different media all over the globe. They often look for common biases in how an event is portrayed in the many different types of media. The use of large-scale monitoring techniques by computer scientists enabled the exploration of different aspects of the media system such as the visualisation of the media-sphere, the sentimental and objectivity analysis of news content.

In 2021, media monitoring proved to be useful in the COVID-19 vaccine rollout, as it allowed social scientists to analyze the sentiment surrounding vaccines among the populous. They collected information from various articles and posts on social media from around the internet related to vaccines, which helped them capture and compile people's various complex opinions on vaccinations.  Social media interactivity, such as likes, comments, and retweets, also contributed to the study, as they helped indicate whether or not a post was in agreement with the opinion of the general population.

Technologies involved
Media monitoring is practically achieved by a combination of technologies—including audio and video recording, high speed text scanners and text recognition software—and human readers and analysts. The automation of the process is highly desirable and can be partially achieved by deploying data mining and machine learning techniques. These technologies compile and index data from all types of online media sites, such as Twitter, Instagram, and Reddit, which allows for a user to search for specific data on these sites, such as brands, mentions, and opinions, in a more streamlined, simple way.

Public Relation teams may often purchase these tools online for a premium, as they are important for their job and help make it much easier. Popular paid software tools include:

 TalkWalker Alerts
 Google Alerts
 Hootsuite
 Social Searcher

Free versions of these tools also exist, although with less capabilities, created for more casual instances of media monitoring.

See also
 Media monitoring service
 Social media measurement
 Literature review
 Media intelligence

References

 
Mass media
Social information processing